The Philosopher Kings is a 2009 documentary film directed by Patrick Shen, and produced by Greg Bennick, about custodial workers at major U.S. universities and their lives.

Filming took place at Cornish College of the Arts; UC Berkeley; Duke University; University of Florida; Princeton University, for the section about Josue Lajeunesse; the California Institute of Technology; and Cornell University. The film premiered at Silverdocs in June 2009 and was shown at the SF DocFest film festival at The Roxie in San Francisco in October 2009.

External links

The Philosopher Kings at Silverdocs
"Film Competes for Sterling Feature Award at Silverdocs" (June 5, 2009 press release)
Jay Youngdahl's Review in East Bay Express (October 21, 2009)
Arts of War on the Web review

References

2009 films
American documentary films
Cleaning and maintenance occupations
Universities and colleges in the United States
2009 documentary films
2000s English-language films
2000s American films
Works about higher education